Aloha Moon is the debut studio album by dream pop band Magic Wands, released on April 24, 2012, by Bright Antenna. The album was made available as a digital download, CD and vinyl LP. It was produced by Sep V and Dave Sardy.

History
The album was announced on the Spin website on February 7, 2012, along with a stream of the single "Space".

On February 28, 2012, the music video for "Space" premiered at Paper.

On March 12, 2012, Sep V's remix of "Black Magic" premiered at Prefix Magazine.

The album was released by Bright Antenna on April 24, 2012.

Track listing

Vinyl edition
Aloha Moon
Teenage Love
Kaleidoscope Hearts
Crystals
Warrior
Black Magic
Treasure
Wolves
Kiss Me Dead
Space (Sep V Mix)

Digital/CD version
Aloha Moon
Teenage Love
Kaleidoscope Hearts
Crystals
Warrior
Black Magic
Treasure
Wolves
Kiss Me Dead
Space (D. Sardy Mix)

Digital deluxe version
Aloha Moon
Teenage Love
Kaleidoscope Hearts
Crystals
Warrior
Black Magic
Treasure
Wolves
Kiss Me Dead
Space (D. Sardy Mix)
Heartbreak Whirl   
Warrior (D. Sardy Mix)  
Space (Sep V Mix)  
Black Magic (Sep V Mix)  
Space (Radio Edit)

Use In Media 
Black Magic was a playable song in the game Rocksmith 2014.

References

2012 albums